Ramon Casas and Pere Romeu in an Automobile is an oil on canvas painting by Spanish painter Ramon Casas, created in 1901. It is exhibited at the National Art Museum of Catalonia in Barcelona.

Description
The painting depicts the artist and his friend, the businessman Pere Romeu (1862–1908), in a red automobile. Casas is sitting at the wheel and the two men are wearing hats and large furs. Each one also has a pipe in his mouth. In front of the car, the artist's dog Ziem stands on a basket and scouts for an oncoming carriage. The speed is emphasized by the positions of the two drivers and the movement of his wheels. The talent of Casas as one of the great poster artists of Catalan modernism can be noticed in the imagery of the painting.

This canvas actually replaced another one by Casas, with the same men riding on a tandem, in 1901, at the decoration of the art café "Els Quatre Gats", usually attended by both of them, which they had co-founded and was a stronghold of modernism in Barcelona. The two paintings came to symbolize the transition between the old (the tandem bicycle) and the new (the automobile), and both have become synonymous with Catalan modernism.

See also
 Ramon Casas and Pere Romeu on a Tandem

References

External links
 Ramon Casas and Pere Romeu in an Automobile on the National Art Museum of Catalonia website
 Ramon Casas and Pere Romeu in an Automobile and On a Tandem on the National Art Museum of Catalonia's YouTube channel
 Ramon Casas and Pere Romeu in an Automobile on Google Art Project

Paintings in the collection of the Museu Nacional d'Art de Catalunya
Paintings by Ramón Casas
1901 paintings
Car-related mass media
Dogs in art